Bruit, also called vascular murmur, is the abnormal sound generated by turbulent flow of blood in an artery due to either an area of partial obstruction or a localized high rate of blood flow through an unobstructed artery. 

The bruit may be heard ("auscultated") by securely placing the head of a stethoscope to the skin over the turbulent flow, and listening. Most bruits occur only in systole, so the bruit is intermittent and its frequency dependent on the heart rate. Anything increasing the blood flow velocity such as fever, anemia, hyperthyroidism, or physical exertion, can increase the amplitude of the bruit.

Etymology

Associated terms

Describing location of a partial obstruction
 Peripheral vascular disease; femoral artery stenosis
 Renal artery stenosis
 Stroke, carotid artery stenosis
 Aortic aneurysm
 Tinnitus – a symptom which may be caused by a cranial artery bruit
 Arteriovenous malformation
 Coarctation of the aorta
 Hepatocellular carcinoma
 Alcoholic hepatitis

Describing the mechanism of a partial obstruction
 Atherosclerosis (atheroma or plaque) (cholesterol deposition in artery wall)
 Median arcuate ligament syndrome, celiac artery stenosis – external compression

Describing location of localized high blood flow
 Arteriovenous (AV) fistula – pathologic or surgically created 
 Graves' disease, goitre
 Paget's disease

Unclassified
 Polymyalgia rheumatica
 Giant cell arteritis
 Fibromuscular dysplasia
 IgG4-related disease

See also
 Carotid bruit
 Souffle

References

External links 

 American Heart Organization

Symptoms and signs: Vascular